The Retirement Benefits Authority (RBA) is a regulatory body established by the Government of Kenya to supervise the establishment and management of retirement benefits schemes  in the Republic of Kenya.

Establishment 
Prior to enactment of the Retirement Benefits Act, the retirement benefits sector in Kenya was regulated by fragmented legislation, mostly Trust and Income Tax Laws. Without a specific body or regulations to set industry standards, pension schemes adopted different styles of operation, leading to serious challenges in proper administration of the sector,

RBA was subsequently established by amendment of the Retirement Benefits Act in a bid to resolve the problem by centralizing the administration of the sector within a single entity.

Objectives 
Retirement Benefits Authority is mandated to:

 Protect the interest of members and sponsors of retirement Benefits schemes.
 Advise the Government on matters relating to retirement benefits.
 Develop and promote the retirement benefits sector.
 Implement all Government policies relating to retirement benefits.
 Regulate and supervise the establishment and management of retirement Benefits schemes.

See also 

 Capital Markets Authority

References 

Commercial and Financial Services
1997 establishments in Kenya
Insurance organizations
Insurance regulation
Insurance in Kenya
Kenya articles needing expert attention
Regulation in Kenya